Senegal competed at the 1992 Summer Olympics in Barcelona, Spain.

Competitors
The following is the list of number of competitors in the Games.

Results by event

Athletics 
Men's 100 metres
 Charles-Louis Seck
 Heat — 10.57 (→ did not advance)

Men's 200 metres
 Ibrahima Tamba

Men's 800 metres
 Babacar Niang

Men's 400 m Hurdles
 Amadou Dia Ba
 Heat — 49.47 (→ did not advance)

Men's 4 × 100 m Relay
 Charles-Louis Seck, Amadou M'Baye, Seynou Loum, and Oumar Loum

Men's Long Jump
 Badara Mbengue
 Qualification — DNS (→ did not advance)

Women's 100 metres
 N'Dèye Dia

Women's 400 metres
 Aïssatou Tandian

Judo 
Men's Half-Lightweight
 Pierre Sène

Men's Lightweight
 Malick Seck

Men's Half-Middleweight
 Amadou Guèye

Men's Middleweight
 Aly Attyé

Men's Half-Heavyweight
 Moussa Sall

Men's Heavyweight
 Khalif Diouf

Swimming 
Men's 50 m Freestyle
 Mouhamed Diop
 Heat — 24.69 (→ did not advance, 49th place)

 Bruno N'Diaye
 Heat — 25.35 (→ did not advance, 57th place)

Men's 100 m Freestyle
 Mouhamed Diop
 Heat — 55.82 (→ did not advance, 64th place)

 Bruno N'Diaye
 Heat — 56.39 (→ did not advance, 68th place)

Men's 200 m Individual Medley
 Mouhamed Diop
 Heat — 2:23.92 (→ did not advance, 50th place)

Wrestling 
Men's Greco-Roman Heavyweight
 Alioune Diouf

Men's Greco-Roman Super-Heavyweight 
 Bounama Touré

Men's Freestyle Heavyweight 
 Alioune Diouf

Men's Freestyle Super-Heavyweight 
 Mor Wade

References 

 Senegalese Olympic Committee
 Official Olympic Reports
 sports-reference

Nations at the 1992 Summer Olympics
1992
Summer Olympics